Knapstad is a village in the municipality of Hobøl, Norway. Its population (2005) is 1,133, of which 78 people live within the border of the neighboring municipality Spydeberg.

Villages in Østfold
Hobøl